The 1998 Lao League was the ninth recorded season of top flight football in Laos. Khammouan Province Team won the championship though it is unclear whether this was a genuine league championship. Public Health Ministry FC quit the league having been ever-present since at least 1982.

References

Lao Premier League seasons
Laos
Laos
1